Daniel "Danny" Silva (born 1973 in Perth Amboy, New Jersey) is an American-born Portuguese cross-country skier who has competed since 2004. Competing in two Winter Olympics, he earned his best finish of 93rd in the 15 km event at Turin in 2006.

Silva's best finish at the FIS Nordic World Ski Championships was 77th in the individual sprint event at Sapporo in 2007.

His best career finish was ninth in a lesser event at a 2 x 5 km pursuit event in Poland in 2006.

References

1973 births
American people of Portuguese descent
Cross-country skiers at the 2006 Winter Olympics
Cross-country skiers at the 2010 Winter Olympics
Living people
Olympic cross-country skiers of Portugal
Portuguese male cross-country skiers
Sportspeople from Perth Amboy, New Jersey